Tang-e Khiareh (also Romanized as Tang-e Khīāreh; also known as Khīāreh) is a village in Kushk-e Hezar Rural District, Beyza District, Sepidan County, Fars Province, Iran. At the 2006 census, its population was 514, in 121 families.

References 

Populated places in Beyza County